Ray H. Schoonover (June 9, 1896 – November 4, 1966) was an American businessman and politician.

Born in Saint Paul, Minnesota, Schoonover was raised and went to the public schools in Monticello, Green County, Wisconsin. He then served in the United States Army during World War I. Schoonover was in the automobile, real estate, and insurance businesses in Monroe, Wisconsin. Schoonover served as under-sheriff and the sheriff of Green County, Wisconsin from 1940 to 1944 and was a Republican. He also served on the Green County Board of Supervisors and was the assistant coroner. In 1946, Schoonover served in the Wisconsin State Assembly. From 1953 to 1961, Schoonover served as United States marshal for the United States District Court for the Western District of Wisconsin. Schoonover died in Madison, Wisconsin as a result of a stroke.

Notes

1896 births
1966 deaths
Businesspeople from Saint Paul, Minnesota
People from Monroe, Wisconsin
Military personnel from Wisconsin
Businesspeople from Wisconsin
Wisconsin sheriffs
County supervisors in Wisconsin
Republican Party members of the Wisconsin State Assembly
20th-century American politicians
Politicians from Saint Paul, Minnesota
People from Monticello, Green County, Wisconsin
20th-century American businesspeople